Banate of Lugos and Karánsebes was an administrative territorial entity of the vassal Ottoman Principality of Transylvania in the 16th century. It was located in the south-eastern part of the region of Banat.

History
The Banate of Lugos and Karánsebes was formed gradually between 1526 and 1536, after the battle of Mohács, when the Banate of Severin was divided. Its eastern side, from Orsova (present-day Orșova), came under the jurisdiction of the Wallachian ruler. In the western part, it was formed this new political and military border entity.

In 1658, the new Prince of Transylvania, ceded the region to the Ottoman Empire.

Cities

The Banate of Lugoj and Caransebeș included the following cities: 
Lugos (now Lugoj)
Karánsebes (now Caransebeș)
Versecz (now Vršac)
Boksánbánya (now Bocșa)
Resicza (now Reșița) 
Karasevo (now Carașova)
Mehadia

Bans of Lugoj and Caransebeș 
 Michael de Somlya (1536)
 Péter Petrovics (1544–1549)
 John Glessan (1552)
 Gregory Bethlen of Iktár (1563)
 Gabriel Bethlen of Iktár (1564)
 Stephen Trompa (1575–1577)
 Gregory Palotić (fl. 1594)
 Paul Keresztesy (1605–1606) and (1610–1613)
  (1644-1658)

See also
Banat
Principality of Transylvania (1571–1711)

External links
Map of the Banate of Lugos and Karánsebes in 1568

History of Banat
Modern history of Romania
Ottoman Serbia
Ottoman history of Vojvodina
Principality of Transylvania (1570–1711)
Eastern Hungarian Kingdom
Caransebeș